Flaxton can refer to:
Flaxton, New Zealand
Flaxton, North Dakota, USA
 Flaxton, North Yorkshire, England
 Flaxton Rural District, a former local government district
Flaxton, Queensland, a locality in the Sunshine Coast Region, Australia